Michael Cadnum (born 1949) is an American poet and novelist.  He has written more than thirty-six books for adults, teens and children.  He is best known for his adult suspense fiction, and young adult fiction based on myths, legends, and historical figures.

Biography
He was born in 1949. Cadnum attended both University of California at Berkeley, and San Francisco State University. He earned a National Endowment of the Arts fellowship for his poetry. He currently resides in Albany, California.

Bibliography

Novels
 Seize the Storm (2012)
 Flash (2010)
 Peril on the Sea (2009)
 The King's Arrow (2008)
 Nightsong: The Legend of Orpheus and Eurydice (2006)
 The Dragon Throne (2005)
 Starfall:  Phaeton and the Chariot of the Sun (2004)
 Ship of Fire (2003)
 Daughter of the Wind (2002)
 The Leopard Sword (2002)
 Forbidden Forest:  the story of Little John and Robin Hood (2002)
  Raven of the Waves (2001)
 Redhanded (2000)
 The Book of the Lion (2000)
 Blood Gold (2004)
 Rundown (1999)
 Heat (1998)
 In A Dark Wood (1998)
 Edge (1997)
 Zero At The Bone (1996)
 The Judas Glass (1996)
 Taking It (1995)
 Skyscape (1994)
 The Horses of the Night (1993)
 Ghostwright (1993)
 Breaking the Fall (1992)
 Saint Peter's Wolf (1992)
 Sleepwalker (1991)
 Calling Home (1991)
 Nightlight (1990)

Short fiction 
Collections
 Can't Catch Me (2006, Tachyon Publications)
  Earthquake Murder (2018)
Stories

Poetry
   The Promised Rain (forthcoming)
   Kingdom (2018)
   This Early Dark (2016)
  "Day by Day" (2003)
 Illicit (chapbook, 2001)
 The Woman Who Discovered Math (chapbook, 2001)
 The Cities We Will Never See (1993)
 By Evening (1992)
 Foreign Springs (chapbook, 1988)
 Invisible Mirror (chapbook, 1987)
 Long Afternoons (1986)
 "Wrecking the Cactus" (pamphlet, 1985)
 The Morning of the Massacre, (chapbook, 1981)

Translations
  Foreign editions of Michael Cadnum's work include Danish, Persian, French, German, Italian, Spanish, among others.

References

External links
 Michael Cadnum Homepage
 A poem by Michael Cadnum in InDigest

1949 births
Living people
American children's writers
Chapbook writers
The Magazine of Fantasy & Science Fiction people
San Francisco State University alumni
University of California, Berkeley alumni